Route 140 is a -long north/south secondary highway in eastern New Brunswick, Canada. Route 140 is a short connector road from Route 15 (exit 37) to the entrance to Parlee Beach Provincial Park. It is the shortest numbered highway in the province.

History
Route 140 was commissioned in 1984.

See also
List of New Brunswick provincial highways

References

140
140
Shediac